Vad is a commune in Cluj County, Transylvania, Romania. It is made up of seven villages: Bogata de Jos (Alsóbogáta), Bogata de Sus (Felsőbogáta), Calna (Kálna), Cetan (Csatány), Curtuiușu Dejului (Déskörtvélyes), Vad and Valea Groșilor (Tőkepataka).

It lies on the left bank of the river Someș.
 
According to the census from 2011, Vad had a total population of 2,008, of whom 95.77% were ethnic Romanians.

Natives
 Eugen Cicero (1940–1997), Romanian-German jazz pianist

References

Communes in Cluj County
Localities in Transylvania